Steib is a surname. Notable people with the surname include:

J. Terry Steib (born 1940), Roman Catholic prelate

See also
Dave Stieb (born 1957), American baseball pitcher
Steib Metallbau, former German sidecar manufacturer